Obaldía is a surname. Notable people with the surname include:

Isabel de Obaldía (born 1957), Panamanian glass artist
José de Obaldía (1806–1889), Neogranadine statesmen and lawyer, President of the Republic of the New Granada
José Domingo de Obaldía (1845–1910), President of Panama from 1908 to 1910
José María Obaldía (born 1925), Uruguayan teacher, poet, and lexicographer
María Inés Obaldía (born 1959), Uruguayan communicator
María Olimpia de Obaldía (1891–1985), Panamanian poet
René de Obaldia (1918–2022), French playwright and poet

See also
Obaldía, Panama